Thynnichthys thynnoides is a species of fish in the family Cyprinidae from mainland southeast Asia and the islands of Borneo and Sumatra.

Habitat 
It is found in freshwater habitats.

Dispersion 
Thynnichthys thynnoides is found in the Mekong River and Chao Phraya River.

References

External links 
 http://www.fishbase.org/summary/16209

Fish of Thailand
Cyprinid fish of Asia
Fish described in 1852